Australicium is a genus of two species of crust fungi in the family Phanerochaetaceae. The genus was circumscribed by mycologists Kurt Hjortstam and Leif Ryvarden in 2002 to contain the type species, A. singulare, which is found in New Zealand. The Venezuelan species A. cylindrosporum was added to the genus in 2005.

References

Phanerochaetaceae
Polyporales genera
Taxa named by Leif Ryvarden
Taxa described in 2002